Disphragis anatole is a moth of the family Notodontidae. It is found in north-eastern Ecuador and possibly eastern Peru.

The length of the forewings is 17.5–23 mm. The ground colour of the forewings is olive green suffused with white, especially near the apex. The ground colour of the hindwings is golden white, but the anterior margin is moss green at the base and the outer two thirds is broadly suffused with moss green scales.

Etymology
The species name is derived from Greek anatole (meaning sunrise or east) and refers to the eastern distribution of this taxon, which contrasts with its western sister species Disphragis tricolor.

References

Moths described in 2011
Notodontidae